Lumayo Ka Nga Sa Akin is a 2016 Filipino satirical comedy anthology film based on Bob Ong's 2011 book of the same name. It was directed by Mark Meily, Andoy Ranay and Chris Martinez starring Cristine Reyes, Maricel Soriano, Herbert Bautista, Antoinette Taus, Paolo Ballesteros, Jason Gainza, Candy Pangilinan, Benjie Paras and Shy Carlos. It was released on January 13, 2016.

The film parodies mainstream Filipino movies and television shows, as well as popular culture, while tackling several national issues at the same time.

Synopsis

Bala Sa Bala, Kamao Sa Kamao, Satsat Sa Satsat

The first film in the trilogy centers around Diego, an action star who wants to take revenge against a group of bad guys, also known as "Bandidos" (bandits), after they killed his parents, his wife, Ashley, and everyone  who attended their wedding, just a few moments right after they get married at the beginning of the film. As the story unfolds, Diego, being an action star, gets into misadventures and finds himself in trouble-after-trouble. Unfortunately, Divina Tuazon, a famous actress and Diego's new found leading lady, was kidnapped by the Bandidos. Finally, in an abandoned warehouse (a setting where most of Pinoy action films' final scenes takes place), Diego unsuccessfully tries to save Divina from the evil hands of Bandido's merciless and heartless leader named "Bos".

The plot generally follows themes from classic Filipino action movies, as well as  comedy films from early 80's to 90's. For example, Diego's sidekicks, Dodoy and Momoy uses slapstick from time to time, a type of comedy which was very popular in the country for the past decades.

Shake, Shaker, Shakest

A middle-class family was forced to enter and stay in a white haunted house for several days after being stranded in an unfamiliar place after an old lady suddenly appeared in front of the car. The old lady was added in the story so that they have a reason to enter the haunted house. They are greeted by Bollywood dance production that ask them to find the possessed object before the next full moon, it starts with letter C and ends with letter R. An Indian caretaker was added to introduce fresh ideas on horror movie, but audience usually do not like fresh ideas. The family realizes that the ghost behind the hauntings is that of a prospective author whom they rejected in their bookstore business as they thought his ideas were unbefitting of their reputation. The title is play on the Shake, Rattle & Roll film series and the plot is a ludicrous horror film.

Asawa ni Marie

A rags-to-riches story about Marie, a poor girl who has a confusing status in life and love while she and her family is abused by a rich landowner and is the eye of the landowner's two sons. After being presumably drowned by a rival for love, she returns after three years as a rich person who works at the former landowner's firm and resumes her relationship with the two heirs. Her old rival tries to stop them but is injured in ridiculous situations before finally receiving the "ultimate injury" of losing her acting career. The movie ends with Marie undecided about which heir to marry. The plot is similar to Philippine dramas/soap operas, particularly Marimar and brands from commercial.

Cast

Bala sa Bala, Kamao sa Kamao, Satsat sa Satsat

 Benjie Paras as Diego
 Candy Pangilinan as Divina Tuazon
 Bearwin Meily
 Rez Cortez as Bos
 Roxanne Barcelo as Joleena Ann Baretto

Shake, Shaker, Shakest
 Maricel Soriano as Cora Catacutan
 Herbert Bautista as Carlos Catacutan
 Shy Carlos as Aby Catacutan
 Andrew Muhlach as Mar Catacutan
 JM Ibañez as Samuel Catacutan
 Ryan Eigenmann as Pundit

Asawa ni Marie
 Cristine Reyes as Marie/Mharilyn
 Antoinette Taus as Señorita Avila
 Paolo Ballesteros as Señorito Boglee Ginintuan
 Jason Gainza as Señorito Lapid
 Jackie Lou Blanco as Señorita Onor
 Joey Paras as Aling Minda
 Sam Y.G. as the voice of Yagit
 Jaime Fabregas as Priest
 Donnalyn Bartolome as herself
 Mark Bautista as himself
 Louise Bolton as herself

Production 
In 2012, Viva Films was able to acquire the rights to two of Bob Ong's books, ABNKKBSNPLAko and his other book Lumayo Ka Nga Sa Akin. Ong himself was never present during negotiations and only exchanged emails with VIVA. Anne Curtis was originally to play Señorita Avila but replaced by Antoinette Taus.

Release 
Lumayo Ka Nga Sa Akin premiered on January 11, 2016, at SM Megamall. It then opened in other cinemas two days later. It was Viva Films' first movie of 2016. It was also the first Tagalog movie of 2016 after the 2015 Metro Manila Film Festival.

Reception 
Pep.ph recommended the film for its cast, humor, and message, as the film called on "...movie producers to come up with films that won't insult the intelligence of viewers and become an embarrassment to the industry." Rappler however, gave a negative review of the film saying "In the end, the film is nothing more than a collection of abysmal stories that are crafted with very little ingenuity."

References 

Philippine comedy films
2016 comedy films
Viva Films films
2010s Tagalog-language films
2010s English-language films
Films based on Philippine novels
2016 films
2016 multilingual films
Philippine multilingual films
Films directed by Chris Martinez